This is a list of Asian national football team managers. This encompasses every manager who currently manages a national team under the control of AFC.

Managers

See also
List of Oceanian national football team managers
List of European national football team managers
List of African national football team managers
List of South American national football team managers
List of North American national soccer team managers

References